The Codroipo electoral district (official name: Friuli-Venezia Giulia - 04 uninominal district) was an uninominal district in Italy for the Chamber of Deputies.

Territory 
As required by law, it was part of the Friuli-Venezia Giulia electoral constituency.

The Codroipo-district was composed by 86 comuni: Amaro, Ampezzo, Arba, Arta Terme, Artegna, Basiliano, Bertiolo, Bordano, Buja, Camino al Tagliamento, Cassacco, Castelnovo del Friuli, Cavasso Nuovo, Cavazzo Carnico, Cercivento, Chiusaforte, Clauzetto, Codroipo, Colloredo di Monte Albano, Comeglians, Coseano, Dignano, Dogna, Enemonzo, Fagagna, Fanna, Flaibano, Forgaria nel Friuli, Forni Avoltri, Forni di Sopra, Forni di Sotto, Frisanco, Gemona del Friuli, Lauco, Lestizza, Ligosullo, Magnano in Riviera, Majano, Malborghetto Valbruna, Martignacco, Mereto di Tomba, Moggio Udinese, Montenars, Moruzzo, Osoppo, Ovaro, Pagnacco, Paluzza, Pasian di Prato, Paularo, Pinzano al Tagliamento, Pontebba, Povoletto, Prato Carnico, Preone, Ragogna, Ravascletto, Raveo, Reana del Rojale, Resiutta, Rigolato, Rive d'Arcano, San Daniele del Friuli, San Vito di Fagagna, Sappada, Sauris, Sedegliano, Sequals, Socchieve, Sutrio, Tarcento, Tarvisio, Tolmezzo, Tramonti di Sopra, Tramonti di Sotto, Trasaghis, Travesio, Treppo Carnico, Treppo Grande, Tricesimo, Venzone, Verzegnis, Villa Santina, Vito d'Asio and Zuglio.

The district was part of the province of Udine and Pordenone.

The district was part of the Friuli-Venezia Giulia - 01 plurinominal district.

Elected

Electoral results

References 

Constituencies established in 2017
Chamber of Deputies constituencies in Italy